Joshua Siegel is an American Mechanical Engineer, inventor, and entrepreneur. As of January 2019, he is an Assistant Professor of Computer Science and Engineering at Michigan State University. Previously, he was a Research Scientist at MIT, the lead instructor of MIT's Internet of things Bootcamp, a parallel entrepreneur and founder of the connected car startup and consultancy CarKnow LLC as well as the vehicle prognostic startup DataDriven. His research areas include connected vehicle technologies, pervasive sensing, and secure and efficient architectures for connectivity. Siegel and his companies have been recognized with several awards for his work developing platforms to collect and analyze vehicle data, including the Lemelson-MIT Student Prize and the MassIT Government Innovation Prize.

Early life and education 
Siegel grew up near Detroit, Michigan with one sibling. He attended Cranbrook Schools in Bloomfield Hills, Michigan, where he learned programming, mechanics, and electronics as a member of the robotics team. From an early age, his passions revolved around restoring and improving vehicles, and these hobbies led him to continue researching vehicles when he left home to attend MIT in pursuit of his undergraduate degree. While at MIT, Siegel ran the Entrepreneurs Club and briefly co-led the Electric Vehicle Team as it finalized its electrification of a Porsche 914.

Siegel received his S.B. from MIT in 2011, S.M. in 2013, and Ph.D in 2016. His undergraduate thesis described the development of an aftermarket solution for connecting vehicles to the Internet, while his master's work explored the creation of a tamper-resistant vehicle data collection device to support the deployment of a vehicle miles traveled (VMT) tax. His dissertation work developed architectures for the Internet of Things and applied connected vehicle data to predicting mechanical failures.

Research
Siegel's work focuses on designing platforms for collecting and analyzing vehicle data, with an emphasis on prognostics (failure prediction) and user experience improvements. His academic work in these areas led him to found CarKnow LLC, which allows vehicle owners and operators take advantage of their vehicle's data through the use of an open application development platform.

Siegel additionally researches techniques for improving vehicle security and he has provided consulting services to identify and address faults within internal and wide area vehicle networks.

In his capacity as a connected vehicle expert, Siegel has appeared in popular media including PRI's Science Friday and AOL Media's Translogic. Additionally, he has been interviewed and cited in the likes of WIRED and the New York Times. He has additionally authored opinion pieces printed in The Detroit News and Computerworld.

Siegel today continues his research developing a secure and efficient architecture for the Internet of Things. He is preparing to commercialize his work identifying vehicle faults using pervasively sensed data from conventional smartphone devices.

Awards
In 2008, Siegel and his cofounder at Course Zero Automation won the MIT Institute for Soldier Nanotechnologies Boeing Prize for their work on developing a soldier-portable inertial navigation unit.

In 2014, Siegel's startup, CarKnow LLC, was awarded the MassChallenge MassIT Government Innovation Competition Prize, a $25,000 award with the opportunity to pilot the company's technology with the Commonwealth of Massachusetts. In this same year, Siegel was also a member of the team winning BMW-EURECOM's "Ideation Award" at the BMW Summer School program.

In 2015, he was awarded the Lemelson-MIT Student Prize for his work in developing vehicle data collection platforms, including his work on the Carduino car-to-Cloud interface.

Siegel and his sole-proprietor company CarKnow have been recognized with numerous other accolades. CarKnow was a semi-finalist in the 2014 IPSO Alliance Challenge, a Cloud Hero of the Year, a finalist in Telematics Update's "Industry Newcomer" award, a finalist in the Global Automotive Innovation Challenge, an IoT/M2M Hero of the Year and a finalist for the Innovation World Cup's Mobility and Geo Awards.

References 

1988 births
Living people
American mechanical engineers
MIT School of Engineering alumni
21st-century American inventors